Dwight Crandall Tosh  (born November 12, 1948) is a retired trooper of the Arkansas State Police from Jonesboro, Arkansas, who is a Republican member of the Arkansas House of Representatives for District 52 in Craighead Poinsett, Jackson, and Independence counties in the northeastern portion of his state.

Biography

Tosh and his wife, Joan, have two children. He is a non-denominational Christian. He formerly resided in Newport, Forrest City, and Bentonville, Arkansas.  In 1962, at the age of 13, Tosh was diagnosed with Hodgkin lymphoma.  He received treatment at St. Jude Children's Research Hospital in Memphis, Tennessee, where he was the hospital's seventeenth patient.

References

1948 births
21st-century American politicians
American state police officers
Arkansas Republicans
Living people
People from Bentonville, Arkansas
People from Forrest City, Arkansas
People from Newport, Arkansas
Politicians from Jonesboro, Arkansas